The NXT Cruiserweight Championship (originally known as the WWE Cruiserweight Championship from 2016 to 2019) is a former professional wrestling championship that was created and promoted by the American promotion WWE. Before its retirement, it was defended on the NXT, NXT UK, and 205 Live brands. During its tenure, it was the only WWE championship with a weight limit.

Established as the WWE Cruiserweight Championship, the title was originally part of the Raw brand and defended on Monday Night Raw until the premiere of 205 Live, after which, it was defended on both shows until WrestleMania 34. Following this event, 205 Live became its own brand and the title became exclusive to 205 Live until October 2019 when it began to be defended on NXT. The title was subsequently renamed to NXT Cruiserweight Championship. In January 2020, the title was extended to NXT's sister brand NXT UK.

The championship was generally contested in professional wrestling matches, in which participants executed scripted finishes rather than contend in direct competition. The inaugural champion was T. J. Perkins, who was awarded the title for winning the Cruiserweight Classic on September 14, 2016. Carmelo Hayes is recognized as the final champion. He defeated Roderick Strong on the special New Year's Evil episode of NXT 2.0 on January 4, 2022, to unify the title with the NXT North American Championship; the Cruiserweight Championship was immediately retired following his win.

Throughout the championship's short history, there were 20 reigns between 18 champions and one vacancy. The oldest champion was Roderick Strong, winning the title at 38 years old, while the youngest champion was Lio Rush when he won it at 24. Neville and Enzo Amore were tied for the most reigns at two. Jordan Devlin's sole reign was the longest reign at 439 days, while final champion Carmelo Hayes' singular reign was the shortest at less than a minute as the title was immediately retired after he won it in a title unification match.

Reigns

Names

Reigns

Combined reigns

References

External links 
Official NXT Cruiserweight Title History

WWE champions
WWE NXT championships
WWE 205 Live
WWE NXT
WWE Raw